Blidsberg is a locality situated in Ulricehamn Municipality, Västra Götaland County, Sweden with 508 inhabitants in 2010.

TV-personligheter 
Ingegerd Samuelsson i humorgruppen "Kass humor" kommer härifrån.

References 

Populated places in Västra Götaland County
Populated places in Ulricehamn Municipality